Betenkyos (Bötöŋkös) is a rural locality (a selo), the administrative center of, and one of three settlements in addition to Alysardakh and Engya-Sayylyga in Adychchinsky Rural Okrug of Verkhoyansky District in the Sakha Republic, Russia, located  from Batagay, the administrative center of the district. Its population as of the 2010 Census was 826; up from 805 recorded during the 2002 Census.

References

Notes

Sources
Official website of the Sakha Republic. Registry of the Administrative-Territorial Divisions of the Sakha Republic. Verkhoyansky District. 

Rural localities in Verkhoyansky District